Bulbophyllum bowkettiae, commonly known as the striped snake orchid, is a species of epiphytic or lithophytic orchid with thin, creeping rhizomes and flattened pseudobulbs each with a single tough, dark green leaf and a single cream-coloured flower with red stripes. It grows on trees and rocks in rainforest in tropical North Queensland, Australia.

Description 
The flower is sometimes completely red. Flowering occurs from April to September.

Taxonomy and naming
Bulbophyllum bowkettiae was first formally described in 1885 by Frederick Manson Bailey and the description was published in Proceedings of the Royal Society of Queensland from a specimen "growing on trees between Herberton and Mourilyan Harbour". The specific epithet (bowkettiae) honours Eva F. Bowkett, "a lady who has painted most faithfully, some of the small flower Queensland Orchists".

Distribution and habitat

References

bowkettiae
Endemic orchids of Australia
Orchids of Queensland
Plants described in 1884